This is a list of awards and nominations received by Chinese actress Zhou Xun. 
She has received multiple awards and nominations for her work. In 2009, she became the first Chinese actor to win the "Grand Slam", after winning the three biggest film awards, the Golden Horse Awards , the Hong Kong Film Awards and the Golden Rooster Awards.

Film

Abuja International Film Festival

Asian Film Awards

Asia-Pacific Film Festival

Asia Pacific Screen Awards

Beijing College Student Film Festival

Changchun Film Festival

China Film Director's Guild Awards

Chinese Film Media Awards

Golden Bauhinia Awards

Golden Horse Film Festival and Awards

As a singer

Golden Rooster Awards

Golden Phoenix Awards

Huading Awards

Festival du Film de Paris

Hong Kong Film Award

As a singer

Hong Kong Film Critics Society Award

Hundred Flowers Awards

NETPAC Awards

Macau International Movie Festival

SCO Film Festival

Shanghai Film Critics Awards

Shanghai International Film Festival

Television

Asian Academy Creative Awards

Asia Rainbow TV Awards

Asian Television Awards

Beijing Daily Awards

China TV Drama Awards

China TV Golden Eagle Award

China Television Director Committee Awards

Flying Apsaras Awards

Hengdian Film and TV Festival of China

Huading Awards

Shanghai Television Festival

The Actors of China Awards

References

Zhou, Xun